The Silver Slugger Award is awarded annually to the best offensive player at each position in both the American League (AL) and the National League (NL), as determined by the coaches and managers of Major League Baseball (MLB). These voters consider several offensive categories in selecting the winners, including batting average, slugging percentage, and on-base percentage, in addition to "coaches' and managers' general impressions of a player's overall offensive value". Managers and coaches are not permitted to vote for players on their own team. The Silver Slugger was first awarded in 1980 and is given by Hillerich & Bradsby, the manufacturer of Louisville Slugger bats. The award is a bat-shaped trophy, 3 feet (91 cm) tall, engraved with the names of each of the winners from the league and plated with sterling silver.

Among first basemen, Paul Goldschmidt has won the most Silver Sluggers, with five. Goldschmidt won the award in 2013, 2015, 2017, 2018 (Arizona Diamondbacks) and 2022 (St. Louis Cardinals). Tied for second are Todd Helton (Colorado Rockies; 2000–2003) and Albert Pujols (St. Louis Cardinals; 2004, 2008–2010) with four. In the American League, six players have won the award three times: José Abreu (Chicago White Sox; 2014, 2018, 2020), Miguel Cabrera (Detroit Tigers; 2010, 2015, 2016) Cecil Cooper (Milwaukee Brewers; 1980–1982); Carlos Delgado (Toronto Blue Jays; 1999–2000, 2003), Don Mattingly (New York Yankees; 1985–1987); and Mark Teixeira (Texas Rangers, 2004–2005; New York Yankees, 2009). Jeff Bagwell, formerly of the National League's Houston Astros, has also won the award three times (1994, 1997, 1999). One player has won the award while playing for two different teams during his winning season. Fred McGriff was traded by the San Diego Padres to the Atlanta Braves during the 1993 season; he won the Silver Slugger Award with a .291 batting average and 37 home runs between the two teams. One father-son combination has won the award: Cecil Fielder won the American League Silver Slugger with the Detroit Tigers in 1990 and 1991, and his son Prince Fielder won the National League award with the Milwaukee Brewers in 2007 and 2011, and the American League award with the Tigers in 2012. Nathaniel Lowe and Paul Goldschmidt are the most recent winners.

Helton holds the record for the highest batting average in a first baseman's Silver Slugger-winning season with the .372 mark he set in 2000. In the American League, Frank Thomas' .353 batting average in 1994 ranks first, and is the third-best in the history of the award. Mark McGwire holds the records in both leagues for highest slugging percentage, and the National League record for most home runs. McGwire slugged .730 for the Oakland Athletics in 1996, the year before he was traded to the St. Louis Cardinals. In 1998, McGwire hit 70 home runs on his way to the Major League home run record, slugging .752 while battling the entire season with Sammy Sosa. Chris Davis holds the American League record for most home runs in a Silver Slugger season when he hit 53 in 2013. Andrés Galarraga had 150 runs batted in (RBI) in 1996 when he won the award, followed closely by Ryan Howard's 2006 total of 149. The American League record for a Silver Slugger winner is 145 RBI, achieved by Mattingly (1985) and Delgado (2003).

Key

American League winners

National League winners

Footnotes
The Brewers were members of the American League until 1997, when Commissioner Bud Selig offered the team the option to switch leagues due to a realignment of Major League Baseball's divisions. The Brewers have been members of the National League since 1998.

See also

List of Gold Glove Award winners at first base

References

Inline citations

External links
Louisville Slugger – The Silver Slugger Award

Silver Slugger Award
Awards established in 1980